Yushui is the only district of and one of two divisions of the prefecture-level city of Xinyu, Jiangxi province, China, the other being Fenyi County. The Zip code is 338025.

Administrative divisions

Yushui has direct jurisdiction over 5 subdistricts, 10 towns, and 6 townships.
5 subdistricts

- 5 Former Subdistricts which are merged : Kongmu Jiang Subdistrict, Mahong Subdistrict, Qinyang Subdistrict, Fenghuangwan Subdistrict, and Yangtiangang Subdistrict

10 towns

6 townships

References

Administrative subdivisions of Jiangxi
Xinyu

* Hongyao